The Institut français d'archéologie orientale (or IFAO), also known as the French Institute for Oriental Archaeology in Cairo, is a French research institute based in Cairo, Egypt, dedicated to the study of the archaeology, history and languages of the various periods of Egypt's civilisation.

The IFAO is under the authority of the French Ministry for National Education, Advanced Instruction, and Research.

The Institute conducts archaeological excavations and also publishes a number of books and journals.

History
The IFAO was created on 28 December 1880 by a signed decree of the French Minister of Public Instruction and Fine Arts Jules Ferry, which created a permanent Mission in Cairo, intended as a counterpart in Egypt of the French School at Athens (Ecole française d'Athènes) and French School of Rome (Ecole française de Rome), under the name of French School of Cairo (École française du Caire).

The School adopted its current name of Institut Français d’Archéologie Orientale in 1898. In 1907, the IFAO moved into Mounira Palace. In 1929, a restoration of the building is undertaken, which includes the replacement of the art nouveau decoration on the façade with neo-classical. 

Since February 2011, the IFAO has been a part of the network, Écoles françaises à l’étranger (EFE), made of five higher education and research establishments. The other four establishments are École française d'Athènes (French School in Athens), École française de Rome (French School in Rome), École française d’Extrême-Orient (French School of the Far East), and Casa de Velázquez, Madrid.

Administration

Directors
 1880–1881: Gaston Maspero
 1881–1883: Eugène Lefébure
 1883–1886: Eugène Grébaut
 1886–1898: Urbain Bouriant
 1898–1912: Émile Chassinat
 1912 Mgr Louis Duchesne
 1912–1914: Pierre Lacau
 1914–1928: Georges Foucart
 1928–1940: Pierre Jouguet
 1940–1953: Charles Kuentz
 1953–1959: Jean Sainte-Fare Garnot
 1959–1969: François Daumas
 1969–1976: Serge Sauneron
 1977–1981: Jean Vercoutter
 1981–1989: Paule Posener-Kriéger
 1989–1999: Nicolas Grimal
 1999–2005: Bernard Mathieu
 2005–2010: Laure Pantalacci
 2010–2015: Béatrix Midant-Reynes
 2015–2019: Laurent Bavay
 Since 2019: Laurent Coulon

Head of Scientific and Technical Relations
Jean-Pierre Corteggiani

Recent IFAO archaeological excavations
This section originally from French Wikipedia article: Fouille archéologique en Égypte

Abu Roash, directed by Michel Baud
25 March - 28 April 2004 (10th expedition)
Adaima
1 November - 15 December 2003 (15th expedition)
'Ayn-Manawir (Kharga Oasis)
4 October - 28 December 2003
7 October 2005 - 7 January 2006
'Ayn Soukhna, in collaboration with the Egyptian Supreme Council of Antiquities
4 January - 8 February 2004
Bahariya Oasis, directed by Frederic Hake
27 March - 18 May 2004
Balat ('Ayn-Asil, Dakhla Oasis)
20 December 2003 - 4 May 2004
Baouit
11–29 September 2003
Cairo, on the Ayyoubide Wall (mediaeval)
12 April - 12 June 2003
7 October - 22 November 2003
26 April - 15 June 2004
Deir el-Bahri, with Nathalie Beaux-Grimal
Deir el-Medina
Dendera, conducted by Sylvie Cauville
27 September - 25 October 2003
Ermant (temple of Montu), by Christophe Tiers
12–15 December 2003
Karnak-North (Treasury of Thutmose I)
November 2003 - February 2004
Ouadi Sannour, directed by François Briois and Béatrix Midant-Reynes
2014 to present
Qal' At Al-Guindi
17 February-6 March 2004
the temple of Qasr Al-Aguz
April 2001, carried out by Pr Claude Traunecker (1st expedition)
10 April 2004 - 29 April 2004 (4th expedition)
Saqqara-South, directed by Vassil Dobrev
8 October 2003 - 30 December 2003
Tebtunis (in the Fayum), joint mission with the University of Milan
1994 (1st expedition)
25 August - 30 October 2003
in the area of Aïn Soukhna, joint with the University Paris IV-Sorbonne
Tanis
Tinnîs, in collaboration with the British expedition of the University of Cambridge
5–17 April 2004
El Tôd, carried out by Christophe Thiers (6th expedition)
15 November - 11 December 2003
Tuna el-Gebel (Tomb of Petosiris), by Jean-Pierre Corteggiani

Publications

The Institute has a library containing more than 80,000 volumes, and also publishes a variety of books and journals. The IFAO's scientific members belong to two sections: the first studies ancient Egyptian and papyrological matters, while the second studies the Coptic and Islamic periods.

Journals and book series of the IFAO include:
 Annales islamologiques (AnIsl)
 Bibliothèque d'études Bulletin critique des Annales islamologiques (BCAI)
 Bulletin de la céramique égyptienne (BCE)
 Bulletin de l'Institut Français d'Archéologie Orientale (BIFAO)
 Cahiers des Annales islamologiques (CAI)
 Cahiers de la céramique égyptienne (CCE)
 Documents de fouilles de l'Institut français d'archéologie orientale (DFIFAO)
 Études alexandrines Études urbaines Fouilles de l'Institut français d'archéologie orientale (FIFAO)
 Mémoires publiés par les membres de l'Institut français d'archéologie orientale (MIFAO)
 Mémoires publiés par les membres de la Mission archéologique française du Caire (MMAF)
 Paléographie hiéroglyphique Publications du Service des antiquités de l'Égypte et de l'Ifao (PIFAO)
 Recherches d'archéologie, de philologie et d'histoire (RAPH)
 Répertoire chronologique d'épigraphie arabe (RCEA)
 Textes arabes et études islamiques Temples ptolémaïques Textes et traductions d'auteurs orientaux (TTA)
 Voyageurs occidentaux en Égypte''

References

External links

MacScribe (IFAO's hieroglyphic text processing software)

1880 establishments in Egypt
Research institutes in Egypt
Archaeological research institutes
International research institutes
Egyptology
Institut Français